The 2021 Hokkaido Bank Curling Classic was held from August 19 to 22 at the Hokkaido Bank Curling Stadium in Sapporo, Japan. It was one of the first events of the 2021–22 curling season. The total purse for the event is ¥ 1,700,000 on both the men's and women's sides.

In the men's final, the defending Japanese champions Team Consadole skipped by Yuta Matsumura defeated the Yusuke Morozumi rink TM Karuizawa 7–2. Matsumura and Morozumi also met in the final of the 2020 Japan Curling Championships, with Matsumura winning 6–4 after nine ends. Team Tsuyoshi Yamaguchi, also of Karuizawa and the junior team of Takumi Maeda also qualified for the playoffs, with Yamaguchi winning the third place game 7–4 in an extra end.

On the women's side, the Tori Koana rink, representing Fujikyu capped off a perfect 5–0 tournament by defeating Team Loco Solare skipped by Satsuki Fujisawa 5–4 in the final. Despite winning the event, Team Koana was not eligible to compete in the 2021 Japanese Olympic Curling Trials, as it was held in a best-of-five tournament between the Fujisawa rink and 2021 Japanese champions Team Sayaka Yoshimura, representing Hokkaido Bank. 2019 Japanese champions Team Seina Nakajima and Japanese junior champions Team Sae Yamamoto also qualified for the playoffs, with Nakajima taking the third place game by a score of 5–3.

Men

Teams
The teams are listed as follows:

Round-robin standings
Final round-robin standings

Round-robin results
All draw times are listed in Japan Standard Time (UTC+09:00).

Draw 1
Thursday, August 19, 3:30 pm

Draw 3
Friday, August 20, 10:00 am

Draw 5
Friday, August 20, 5:00 pm

Playoffs

Source:

Semifinals
Saturday, August 21, 1:30 pm

Third place game
Sunday, August 22, 10:00 am

Final
Sunday, August 22, 10:00 am

Women

Teams
The teams are listed as follows:

Round-robin standings
Final round-robin standings

Round-robin results
All draw times are listed in Japan Standard Time (UTC+09:00).

Draw 2
Thursday, August 19, 7:00 pm

Draw 4
Friday, August 20, 1:30 pm

Draw 6
Saturday, August 21, 10:00 am

Playoffs

Source:

Semifinals
Saturday, August 21, 5:00 pm

Third place game
Sunday, August 22, 4:00 pm

Final
Sunday, August 22, 4:00 pm

References

External links
Official Website
Men's Event
Women's Event

2021 in Japanese sport
2021 in curling
August 2021 sports events in Japan
International curling competitions hosted by Japan
Sport in Sapporo